Finché c'è ditta c'è speranza is an Italian television series.

See also
List of Italian television series

External links
 

1990s Italian television series
2000s Italian television series
1999 Italian television series debuts
2003 Italian television series endings